The 1979 World Sportscar Championship season was the 27th season of  FIA World Sportscar Championship racing. It featured the 1979 World Championship for Makes which was open to Group 1 and 2 Touring Cars, Group 3 and 4 Grand Touring cars, and Group 5 Special Production Cars. The championship ran from 3 February to 16 September 1979 and consisted of nine rounds. It was contested in two engine capacity divisions, Over 2 Litres and Under 2 Litres.

The Over 2 Litres Division was won by Porsche and the Under 2 Litres Division by Lancia.

Schedule

Season results

Note: Entries which were not eligible to score championship points are not accounted for in the above table.

Manufacturers' championship
Points were awarded for placings gained by the top ten cars in each division at each round in the order of 20-15-12-10-8-6-4-3-2-1. However, points were only awarded for the highest placed car from each make in each division and any other cars from that make were merely skipped in the points allocation.

Only the best seven round results for each make in each division counted towards the championship with any other points earned not included in the final totals. Relinquished points are shown within brackets.

Some rounds were also open to cars from other categories (e.g. Group 6 "Two Seater Racing Cars") however these cars were not eligible to score points for their respective makes.

Division - Over 2 Litre

Division - Under 2 Litre

The cars
The following  models contributed to the nett points totals scored by their respective makes.

Division - Over 2 Litre
 Porsche 935 & 911 Carrera RSR
 Ferrari Daytona & 308GTB
 de Tomaso Pantera
 Triumph TR8
 BMW 3.5 CSL

Division - Under 2 Litre
 Lancia Beta Montecarlo
 BMW 320i
 Ford Escort
 Porsche
 Fiat X1/9
 Volkswagen Golf GTi
 Audi 80

References

Further reading
 Automobile Year, 1979/80
 János Wimpffen, Time and Two Seats, 1999
 Peter Higham, The Guinness Guide to International Motor Racing, 1995

External links
 1979 World Championship for Makes – race results Retrieved from wsrp.ic.cz
 1979 World Championship for Makes – race images Retrieved from www.racingsportscars.com on 1 April 2009

World Sportscar Championship seasons
World Sportscar Championship